Klepp is a municipality in Rogaland county, Norway. It is located in the traditional district of Jæren. The administrative centre of the municipality is the village of Kleppe. Other villages in Klepp include Klepp stasjon, Orre, Orstad, Pollestad, Verdalen, and Voll. Klepp is a flat and open agricultural landscape. There are long stretches of sand beaches along the North Sea coastline in the west.

The  municipality is the 324th largest by area out of the 356 municipalities in Norway. Klepp is the 63rd most populous municipality in Norway with a population of 20,163. The population around Kleppe is growing rapidly, mostly in the form of suburban single-family homes, but also in the form of some apartment blocks. There is a shopping mall in Kleppe called Jærhagen.

General information

The old parish of Klep was established as a municipality on 1 January 1838 (see formannskapsdistrikt law). The boundaries of the municipality have not changed since that time.

Name
The municipality (originally the parish) is named after the old Klepp farm, since the first Klepp Church was built there. The inscription on the Klepp I Runestone indicates that the name has been in use since the late 10th or early 11th century. The name is identical with the word kleppr which means "rocky hill". Before 1912, the name was written "Klep".

Coat of arms
The coat of arms were granted on 18 February 1972. The arms features a gold cross on a blue background. The cross on the arms symbolizes the large stone cross at Krosshaug in Klepp. Krosshaug is a grave hill located near the site where the local thing met for centuries. The Old Norse word haugr means mound or barrow, hence the name "kross"-haug. The cross was considered a representative historic symbol for the municipality.

Churches
The Church of Norway has four parishes within the municipality of Klepp. It is part of the Jæren prosti (deanery) in the Diocese of Stavanger.

History
{{Historical populations
|footnote = Source: Statistics Norway.
|shading = off
|1951|4973
|1961|5980
|1971|8878
|1981|10758
|1991|11871
|2001|13884
|2011|17397
|2020|19588
}}
The earliest traces of population in the municipality have been dated to around 6000 BC. At that time, the land was covered by large oak woods. The large stone cross standing on the grave hill Krosshaug dates from around 1000 AD and is possibly the oldest in Norway. It is adjacent to Tinghaug'', the site for a local Thing for many centuries during the Iron Age. Tinghaug probably acted as a site for the local court and assembly for many centuries.

Geography
Neighbouring municipalities are Hå to the south, Time to the south and east, Sola and Sandnes to the north. The coastline is agricultural and consists of, from south to north, the areas Orre, Reve, Bore and Sele.

The long Orrestranda beach, one of the longest sandy beaches in Norway, is in Klepp. The river Figgjoelva empties into the North Sea in Klepp. The small island of Feistein lies off shore and is the site of the Feistein Lighthouse. There are two large lakes in Klepp: Orrevatnet and Frøylandsvatnet.

Weather

Transportation
The Sørlandet railway line, historically called the Jæren Line, runs through Klepp along lake Frøylandsvatnet. The nearby Oksnevadporten Station is the other railway station in Klepp.

Economy
Klepp is the second largest agricultural municipality in Rogaland, with a total of around 600 farms. Kverneland Group, located in Kvernaland, is the largest manufacturer of agricultural equipment in the world.

Sports
The local sports club Klepp IL most notably has a women's football team in the Norwegian top league. Famous players include Dagny Mellgren and the national team captain Ane Stangeland Horpestad. Gymnast Åge Storhaug also represented the club.

Government
All municipalities in Norway, including Klepp, are responsible for primary education (through 10th grade), outpatient health services, senior citizen services, unemployment and other social services, zoning, economic development, and municipal roads. The municipality is governed by a municipal council of elected representatives, which in turn elect a mayor.  The municipality falls under the Sør-Rogaland District Court and the Gulating Court of Appeal.

Municipal council
The municipal council of Klepp is made up of 31 representatives that are elected to four year terms. Currently, the party breakdown is as follows:

Mayor
Since 2011, Ane Mari Braut Nese of the Conservative Party has been the mayor. She succeeded Elfin Lea of the same party, who served from 1999 to 2011. In 2019, Sigmund Rolfsen of the Labour Party was elected as mayor.

Parliament
There have been many members of the Parliament of Norway from Klepp. Thore Larsen Braut and Karl K. Kleppe were members of Parliament prior to the Second World War. After the war Lars Storhaug, Oddbjørg Ausdal Starrfelt, and Knut Haus have been members of Parliament.

Notable people 
 Theodor Dahl (1886–1946) a Norwegian journalist, short story writer, novelist and poet
 Asgaut Steinnes (1892–1973) historian, National archivist of Norway, 1933 to 1960
 Torvald Tu (1893–1955) a Norwegian poet, playwright, novelist and writer of humoresques
 Sigve Tjøtta (born 1930) a Norwegian mathematician and long-distance runner
 Åse-Marie Nesse (1934–2001) a Norwegian philologist, academic and poet
 Arne Sølvberg (born 1940) a computer scientist, academic & expert in information modelling

References

External links

Municipal fact sheet from Statistics Norway 
Pictures from Klepp

 
Jæren
Municipalities of Rogaland
1838 establishments in Norway